The  Museum of the Moscow Railway  is situated next to Paveletsky Rail Terminal in Moscow. The museum reopened to private visitors in 2011 and it reopened to the general public in January 2012. It's the object of cultural heritage of Russia.

Overview
The museum was formerly the Museum of Lenin’s funeral train. It still houses exhibits relating to Vladimir Lenin's Funeral train including the 4-6-0 steam locomotive U-127 (Russian У-127) and Lenin’s funeral van No 1691.

See also
 Moscow Railway Museum at Rizhsky station
 History of rail transport in Russia
 List of Moscow tourist attractions
 List of railway museums (worldwide)
 Russian Railway Museum, Saint Petersburg

References

External links
 The Official Museum Website
 Museum of the Moscow Railway at Paveletsky Station, Moscow
 About The Museum of Railroad Machinery [in English]

Museums in Moscow
Cultural depictions of Vladimir Lenin
History of Moscow
Railway museums in Russia
Rail transport in Moscow
Cultural heritage monuments of federal significance in Moscow